Minidoka National Forest was established in Idaho and Utah on July 1, 1908 with  from consolidation of Cassia National Forest and Raft River National Forest, primarily in Idaho. On July 1, 1953 Minidoka was absorbed by Sawtooth National Forest and is now the Sawtooth's Minidoka Ranger District.

References

External links
Forest History Society
Listing of the National Forests of the United States and Their Dates (from the Forest History Society website) Text from Davis, Richard C., ed. Encyclopedia of American Forest and Conservation History. New York: Macmillan Publishing Company for the Forest History Society, 1983. Vol. II, pp. 743-788.

Former National Forests of Idaho
Former National Forests of Utah
Protected areas established in 1908
1908 establishments in Idaho
1908 establishments in Utah
Protected areas disestablished in 1953
1953 disestablishments in Idaho
1953 disestablishments in Utah